The 1923 All-Ireland Senior Football Championship Final was the 36th All-Ireland Final and the deciding match of the 1923 All-Ireland Senior Football Championship, an inter-county Gaelic football tournament for the top teams in Ireland.

Pre-game
The Irish Civil War cast a shadow on the match — Kerry initially considered refusing to play in protest at the imprisonment of County Board chairman and republican Austin Stack. The Kerry team played a selection match between pro- and anti-Treaty players.

Match

Summary
Dublin won the final by two points, with a goal by P. J. Kirwan. Kerry had led 1-2 to 0-1 at half time with a goal from Brosnan but failed to score again in the game. 

Joe Stynes, granduncle of Australian rules footballer Jim Stynes, played on the winning Dublin team that day.

It was the third of three All-Ireland football titles won by Dublin in the 1920s, which made them joint "team of the decade" with Kerry who also won three.

Details

Post-match
The 1923 final marked the end of the initial era of the rivalry between Dublin and Kerry. Dublin would not beat Kerry in the Championship again until the 1976 final. An attendance of 25,000 people was reported at the 1923 final. Dublin would not win another All-Ireland football title until 1942, the county's 19-year barren spell rivalled only by their team of the late 1990s and 2000s.

References

All-Ireland Senior Football Championship Final
All-Ireland Senior Football Championship Final, 1923
All-Ireland Senior Football Championship Finals
Dublin county football team matches
Kerry county football team matches